The Kanada-malja is an ice hockey club championship trophy, awarded annually to the winner of the Finnish Liiga playoffs. Kanada-malja is Finnish for "Canada Bowl"; the trophy is so named because it was donated by Canada's Finnish community in 1951.

In 1991 a copy of the Kanada-malja was made and the original was given for display at Suomen Jääkiekkomuseo ("The Finnish Hockey Hall of Fame"). After the final game, the champion team of the playoffs is presented with the original Kanada-malja, but afterward the cup is returned to the museum and replaced with the copy.

The original trophy is made of nickel silver and the copy is entirely made of silver.

The winner of the regular season title receives the "Harry Lindbladin muistopalkinto" (Harry Lindblad Memorial Trophy), which is not considered as prestigious as the Kanada-malja.

Past champions

Teams by number of wins

See also 

 SM-liiga trophies
 List of Finnish ice hockey champions

References 

Liiga trophies and awards